Miss Earth Germany is a national Beauty pageant in Germany to select an official candidate for the Miss Earth pageant.

Titleholders 
Color key

Miss Earth Germany Casting 2002-2009

See also
Miss Earth
Miss Earth Austria

References

Official website
Miss Earth Germany 
  

Beauty pageants in Germany
Recurring events established in 2010
2010 establishments in Germany
Germany
German awards